Hildegard Frieda Albertine Knef (28 December 19251 February 2002) was a German actress, singer, and writer. She was billed in some English-language films as Hildegard Neff or Hildegarde Neff.

Early years
Hildegard Knef was born in Ulm in 1925. Her parents were Hans Theodor and Friede Augustine Knef. Her father, a decorated First World War veteran, died when she was only six months old, and her mother moved to Berlin and worked in a factory. Knef began studying acting at age 14 in 1940. She left school at 15 to become an apprentice animator with Universum Film AG. After she had a successful screen test, she went to the State Film School at Babelsberg, Berlin, where she studied acting, ballet, and elocution. Joseph Goebbels, who was Hitler's propaganda minister, wrote to her and asked to meet her, but Knef's friends wanted her to stay away from him.

German film career 

Knef appeared in several films before the fall of Nazi Germany, but most were released only afterward. During the Battle of Berlin she dressed as a soldier to stay with her lover, Ewald von Demandowsky, and joined him in the defence of Schmargendorf. The Soviets captured her and sent her to a prison camp. Her fellow prisoners helped her escape and return to Berlin. Von Demandowsky was executed by the Russians on 7 October 1946, but before that he secured for Knef the protection of the well-known character actor Viktor de Kowa in Berlin. De Kowa gave her the opportunity to be a mistress of ceremonies in the theatre that he had opened. Knef also got a part in Marcel Pagnol's Marius, which was directed by Boleslaw Barlog. De Kowa also directed Knef in other plays by Shakespeare, Pagnol, and George Abbott.

Her two best known film roles were "Susanne Wallner" in Wolfgang Staudte's film Die Mörder sind unter uns (The Murderers Are Among Us), produced in 1946 by the East German state film company, and the first film released after the Second World War in East Germany; and "Marina" in Die Sünderin (The Sinner), in which she performed a brief nude scene, the first in German film history, which caused a scandal in 1951. The film was also criticised by the Catholic Church, which protested against the nude scene. Knef stated that she didn't understand the tumult that the film was creating. She wrote that it was totally absurd that people considered her nudity to be scandalous, as Germany was the country that had created Auschwitz and had caused so much horror. She also wrote, "I had the scandal, the producers got the money."

In 1948, she received the best-actress award from the Locarno Film Festival because of her role in the film Film Without a Title. Her singing career started in the 1960s once her film career was not going very well. She performed in television shows such as in episodes of Scarecrow and Mrs. King and in a 2000 documentary in which she was playing by herself Marlene Dietrich: Her Own Song.

In the 1960s she appeared in a number of such low-budget films as The Lost Continent.

She appeared in the 1975 screen adaptation of the Hans Fallada novel, Every Man Dies Alone directed by Alfred Vohrer, released in English as Everyone Dies Alone in 1976, and for which she won an award for best actress at the International Film Festival in Karlovy Vary, then Czechoslovakia.

During her career, she performed in over 50 films. Nineteen of her films were produced in other countries than Germany: the United States, United Kingdom, France, Italy, Austria and Spain.

Career in the United States

David O. Selznick invited her to Hollywood, but she refused to agree to the conditions of the contract which reportedly included changing her name to Gilda Christian and pretending to be Austrian rather than German. Knef was cast as Hilde in the Hollywood film Decision Before Dawn (1951), directed by Anatole Litvak and co-starring with Richard Basehart and Oskar Werner in a story about the later part of World War II.

The following year Knef's first husband, an American named Kurt Hirsch, encouraged her to try again for success in the U.S. She changed her name from Knef to Neff, but was only offered a supporting role in The Snows of Kilimanjaro (1952), an adaptation of an Ernest Hemingway short story.

Her reputation in the U.S. was hurt because of her nude scenes in the German film Die Sünderin (1951) and because she fell in love with a Nazi when she was 19.

Finally, in 1955, Knef was offered a starring role in the Broadway musical Silk Stockings by Cole Porter, which was based on the 1939 film Ninotchka, which had starred Greta Garbo in the title role. Knef had acted in at least 30 films in the United States and Europe, but her triumph came in New York when she played Ninotchka, an unemotional Soviet commissar. The New York Times drama critic Brooks Atkinson described her rendition as "an immensely skillful performance."

Singer
In the 1960s, Knef took a break from acting and started writing song lyrics. In 1963 she started a concert and recording career, and she surprised her audiences with the deep, smoky quality of her voice and with lyrics that were written by herself. Fans around the world rallied in her support as she defeated cancer several times. She returned to Berlin after the reunification. In her peak, an entertainment columnist called her the "willowy blonde" who had a "dusty voice" and a "generous mouth".

The song she is mostly remembered for is "Für mich soll's rote Rosen regnen" ("Red roses are to rain for me"). She is also known for her version of the songs "Ich hab noch einen Koffer in Berlin" ("I still have a suitcase in Berlin") and "Mackie Messer" ("Mack the Knife"). She sold more than three million records in total.

She launched 23 original albums which counted for 320 different songs. She wrote the lyrics for 130 songs herself.

Publications

Her autobiography Der geschenkte Gaul: Bericht aus einem Leben (The Gift Horse: Report on a Life, 1970) was a candid recount of her life in Germany during and after the Second World War, and reportedly became the best-selling German book in the post-war years. Her second book Das Urteil (The Verdict, 1975) was a moderate success, and dealt with her struggle with breast cancer. Knef not only achieved international best-seller status, her books were also widely praised by critics because her autobiographies were "better-than-the-average celebrity's".

In The Gift Horse: Report on a Life Knef recounted her childhood and difficult life being an actress and singer while living in Hitler's Berlin and after the war in Europe and America. Arthur Cooper of Newsweek called it "a bitterly honest book and a very good one". The book doesn't try to persuade the public, depicting a made-up celebrity's adventures, but truthfully recounts her struggles as a German woman who grew up in Berlin under the Nazis. The Gift Horse: Report on a Life was translated to English by Knef's second husband, David Anthony Palastanga.

In The Verdict, which was also translated by Palastanga, Knef looked at her life from another perspective, because she knew that she had cancer. Rachel MacKenzie wrote that Knef had her 56th operation, a mastectomy, in Salzburg on 10 August 1973. MacKenzie stated that from that cancer surgery, life had to be thought of in terms of pre-verdict and post-verdict. The book is divided in these two sections but they are not chronologically ordered because Knef wrote the two sections in a way that the reader is moved forward and backward in time and space. The Verdict describes in great detail the hospital scenes as well as the doctors and nurses in New York, Los Angeles, Zürich and Hamburg, where she was hospitalised.

Personal life
Knef was married three times and divorced twice. Her first marriage was in 1947 to Kurt Hirsch, a U.S. information officer. They divorced in 1952. The second time she married the actor and record producer David Anthony Palastanga, on 30 June 1962. Knef had a daughter with him, Christina Antonia. When Knef was 47, she wrote a letter for her five-year-old daughter. She wrote what she had learned of beauty, of her grandfather's legacy about anti-human beings, of unconditional love and truth. She also wrote that the only mission of humans in this world was to serve in one form or other because she had noticed that those who didn't serve ended up as slaves. When she died, she was still married to her third husband, Paul von Schell.

Knef died at the age of 76 of a lung infection in Berlin, where she had moved after the German reunification. She smoked heavily for most of her life and suffered from emphysema.

Selected filmography

 The Noltenius Brothers (1945)
 Frühlingsmelodie (1945) - Zwilling ohne Leberfleck
 Under the Bridges (1946) - Girl in Havelberg
 Murderers Among Us (1946) - Susanne Wallner
 Between Yesterday and Tomorrow (1947) - Das Mädchen Kat
 Film Without a Title (1948) - Christine Fleming
 Journey to Happiness (1948) - Susanne Loevengaard
 The Sinner (1951) - Marina
 Miracles Still Happen (1951) - Anita Weidner
 Decision Before Dawn (1951) - Hilde
 Nights on the Road (1952) - Inge Hoffmann
 Diplomatic Courier (1952) - Janine Betki
 The Snows of Kilimanjaro (1952) - Countess Liz
 Night Without Sleep (1952) - Lisa Muller
 Alraune (1952) - Alraune
 Henriette (1952) - Rita Solar
 Illusion in a Minor Key (1952) - Lydia Bauer
 The Man Between (1953) - Bettina
 A Love Story (1954) - Lili Schallweiß, Schauspielerin
 It Was Always So Nice With You (1954) - minor role (uncredited)
 Confession Under Four Eyes (1954) - Hilde Schaumburg-Garden
 Svengali (1954) - Trilby
 Escape from Sahara (1958) - Madeleine Durand
 The Daughter of Hamburg (1958) - Maria
 Subway in the Sky (1959) - Lilli Hoffman
 The Man Who Sold Himself (1959) - Martina Schilling
 La strada dei giganti (1960) - Maria Luisa di Borbone
 No Orchids for Lulu (1962) - Baroness Geschwitz
 Ipnosi (1962)
 Caterina di Russia (1963) - Catherine the Great
 Landru (1963) - Mme X. / Madame Ixe
  (1963) - Jenny Diver
 Ballade pour un voyou (1963) - Martha Schwartz
 Das große Liebesspiel (1963) - Callgirl
 Gibraltar (1964) - Elinor van Berg
 Waiting Room to the Beyond (1964) - Laura Lorelli
 Condemned to Sin (1964) - Alwine
 Mozambique (1964) - Ilona Valdez
 The Dirty Dozen (1967) - (uncredited)
 The Lost Continent (1968) - Eva Peters
 Everyone Dies Alone (1976) - Anna Quangel
 Fedora (1978) - The Countess
  (1980) - Peter's mother
 Der Gärtner von Toulouse (1982) - Frau Théophot
 The Future of Emily (1984) - Mutter Paula
 Witchery (1988) - Lady in black
 Pocahontas (1995) - (German dub)
 Eine fast perfekte Hochzeit (1999) - Marlene Wolf-Schönberg - Hennys aunt

Further reading
 Bach, Ulrich E.: The Woman Between: Hildegard Knef's Cold War Berlin Movies in: Broadbent, Philip & Hake, Sabine (eds.) "Berlin: Divided City 1945-1989" (NYC: Berghahn Books, 2010): pp. 115–125.
 Kusztrich, Imre: Ich bin kein Mannequin für Krebs. Reden, fühlen, zittern mit Hildegard Knef. Erinnerungen und Gespräche aus den schwierigsten Jahren einer großen Künstlerin im aufreibenden Kampf mit Medien und Alltag IGK-Verlag, Neusiedl/Österreich 2011, .
 Roek, Petra: Fragt nicht, warum: Hildegard Knef – die Biografie. Edel Edition, Hamburg 2009, .
 Schröder, Christian: Hildegard Knef. Mir sollten sämtliche Wunder begegnen. Biographie. Aufbau-Verlag, Berlin 2004, .
 Trimborn, Jürgen: Hildegard Knef. Das Glück kennt nur Minuten. Deutsche Verlags-Anstalt, München 2005, .
 Weidner, Corinna (Hrsg.): Hildegard Knef. Fotografien von Rico Puhlmann. Schwarzkopf & Schwarzkopf Verlag, München 2005, .
 Weißbarth, Eberhard: Hildegard Knef – zwischen gestern und heute. Verlag Bibliothek der Provinz, Weitra/Österreich 2011, .

References

External links

 Hildegard Knef in the German Dubbing Card Index
 
 
 Fan site, officially authorized* (partly in English)

1925 births
2002 deaths
Actors from Baden-Württemberg
Burials at the Waldfriedhof Zehlendorf
Deaths from emphysema
German autobiographers
German film actresses
German musical theatre actresses
German prisoners of war in World War II held by the Soviet Union
German stage actresses
German voice actresses
German women writers
Officers Crosses of the Order of Merit of the Federal Republic of Germany
People from the Free People's State of Württemberg
People from Ulm
Recipients of the Order of Merit of Berlin
Women autobiographers
20th-century German actresses
20th-century German women singers